Pääsuke is an Estonian surname (meaning swallow). Notable people with the surname include:

Johannes Pääsuke (1892–1918), photographer and filmmaker
Tiit Pääsuke (born 1941), painter

Estonian-language surnames